Qala is a 2022 Indian Hindi-language psychological thriller drama film, written and directed by Anvita Dutt. The film is produced by Karnesh Sharma under Clean Slate Filmz and stars Tripti Dimri, Swastika Mukherjee, and Babil Khan in his film debut. 

It was released on Netflix on 1 December 2022. The film received positive reviews from critics and audience, who praised the performances, direction, writing, visual style, cinematography and soundtrack.

Plot
Set in 1940s Calcutta, Qala is about the tumultuous relationship between an aspiring singer and her domineering mother.
The movie begins with Qala Manjushree who has just won the "Golden Vinyl". She is being interviewed by several journalists who mention her brother. Distraught, Qala replies that she has no brother. In a flashback, her mother(Urmila) who was pregnant with twins gives birth to Qala, but her brother does not survive. Urmila attempts to smother Qala.
Urmila teaches Qala the art of music but warns her against being a courtesan. In the present, Qala is haunted by visions of her brother who accuses her of taking what is rightfully his. A doctor advises Qala to rest. In another flashback, Qala is being taught music to perform in 3 days but Urmila chides her and accuses her of not working hard enough. Urmila locks Qala out in the freezing snow. At the performance, few people show up and Qala is upstaged by an orphan, Jagan. Urmila takes a liking to Jagan's music and brings him home to live with her. Qala is jealous of Jagan. In the present, a renowned singer - Sanyal dies. In another flashback, her mother seduces Sanyal to obtain a chance for Jagan to sing with him. To further Jagan's career, Urmila attempts to marry Qala off but Qala declines. Urmila hosts a party and invites several influential people. At the party, Qala feels invisible but is noticed by Sanyal, whom she kisses. Unfortunately, Jagan falls sick and cannot sing so Qala sings instead, impressing the guests. Jagan gets sicker to the point of being unable to sing but is cared for by Urmila. Qala seduces Sumant Kumar to obtain a chance at recording a song, taking Jagan's place. That night Jagan talks to Qala one last time before he hangs himself in the forest. The next day, Qala discovers his body and hugs his corpse. Her mother is distraught and cradles Jagan in her hands. Urmila and Qala have a fight during which Qala calls Urmila a courtesan. Urmila forbids Qala from coming back to their house ever again. Qala leaves for Calcutta for her recording session. She is nervous and cannot sing even on the 11th take. She was forced to provide oral pleasure to Sumant, for a last chance. She recalls Jagan, who used to sing for himself. Taking his words into account, she successfully records the song. Anushka Sharma makes a cameo here as an actress. Qala slowly rises to fame as a singer. She becomes close with Majshoor, the songwriter who advises her to cease her arrangement with Sumant. While being interviewed by journalists again, she sees a vision of Jagan. While recording a song, she breaks down and sees snow falling all around her. Her mother hears her interview being broadcast over the radio. In a flashback, Qala drops a globule of mercury into Jagan's milk before his performance, leading to his cough. Now, Qala attempts to kill herself by overdosing on sleeping pills. Her doctor calls her mother and informs her of Qala's suicide attempt. Her mother comes to Calcutta and sees that Qala has hanged herself. Her mother tearfully listens to Qala's vinyl which she had sent to her in Himachal Pradesh.

Cast
Tripti Dimri as Qala Manjushree
Swastika Mukherjee as Urmila "Urmi" Manjushree
 Babil Khan as Jagan Batwal
Amit Sial as Sumant Kumar
Sameer Kochhar as Chandan Lal Sanyal
Girija Oak as Sudha
Swanand Kirkire as Mansoor Khan Sahab
Tasveer Kamil as Naseeban Appa
Varun Grover as Majrooh
Abhishek Banerjee as Dr. Banerjee
Anushka Sharma as Actress Devika (cameo)
Nitin Chatterjee as RJ

Production
The film was announced by Netflix on 10 April 2021, Tripti Dimri was cast in the title role, and was joined by Babil Khan. The film marks the second collaboration between Tripti Dimri, Anvita Dutt and Clean Slate Filmz after Bulbbul (2020).

Principal photography started in April 2021, in Kashmir. Filming was completed in October 2021.

Soundtrack

The music for the film was composed by Amit Trivedi, the background score was composed by Sagar Desai, while guest-composed one song "Udh Jaayega" and lyrics were written by Amitabh Bhattacharya, Swanand Kirkire, Varun Grover and Kausar Munir. The teaser of the ghazal, "Phero Na Najariya", was released on 29 August 2022. The first single "Ghodey Pe Sawaar" was released on 16 November 2022. The second single "Rubaaiyaan" was released on 22 November 2022. The third single "Shauq" was released on 24 November 2022. The film also included a remake of a popular Kangri folk song, "Amma Puchdi", sung by Sireesha Bhagavatula.

Marketing and release
The teaser for the film launched on 24 September 2022, on Netflix, and the trailer of the film was released on 15 November 2022.

The film had its World Premiere in Goa at the 53rd International Film Festival of India, on 24 November 2022. Qala was released on Netflix on 1 December 2022.

Reception

See also 
List of Netflix original films

References

External links
 
 

2022 direct-to-video films
Indian direct-to-video films
Indian nonlinear narrative films
Films about the arts
2020s musical drama films
Films about classical music and musicians
Indian musical drama films
Films about teacher–student relationships
2022 drama films
Indian psychological drama films
Hindi-language Netflix original films